Susan Taylor (born 1942) is an American biochemist who is a Professor of Chemistry and Biochemistry and a Professor of Pharmacology at the University of California, San Diego. She is known for her research on protein kinases, particularly protein kinase A. She was elected to the Institute of Medicine and the United States National Academy of Sciences in 1996.

Early life and education
Taylor was born in 1942 in Racine, Wisconsin. She attended the University of Wisconsin as an undergraduate and received a B.A. in biochemistry in 1964. Despite originally planning for a career as a medical doctor, she received her PhD in physiological chemistry from Johns Hopkins University in 1968 and then worked as a postdoctoral fellow at the Medical Research Council Laboratory of Molecular Biology in Cambridge, England, where she has said she settled on a career in research science. After returning to the United States, she worked as a postdoc at the University of California, San Diego.

Academic career
After a brief postdoc position at UCSD, Taylor joined the faculty there in the Department of Chemistry and Biochemistry in 1972 and became a full professor in 1985. She was a Howard Hughes Medical Institute Investigator from 1997 to 2014.

Taylor served on the editorial board of the Journal of Biological Chemistry from 1985-1990 and served a term as the president of the American Society for Biochemistry and Molecular Biology in 1995.

Research
Taylor's research group has focused on the structure and function of protein kinases, particularly protein kinase A, since shortly after she began her independent research career. Her group, collaborating with Janusz Sowadski, was the first to solve the crystal structure of a protein kinase when they reported the structure of PKA in 1991. The group has subsequently published a number of papers on the dynamics and mechanism of PKA, or cyclic AMP-dependent protein kinase.

Awards and honors
 1992: Elected to the American Academy of Arts and Sciences
 1996: Elected to the Institute of Medicine
 1996: Elected to the United States National Academy of Sciences
 2001: Received the Garvan-Olin Medal, awarded by the American Chemical Society
 2007: Received the William C. Rose Award, awarded by the American Society for Biochemistry and Molecular Biology
 2008: Elected to the American Association for the Advancement of Science
 2009: Received the FASEB Excellence in Science Award, awarded by the Federation of American Societies for Experimental Biology
 2017: Earl and Thressa Stadtman Distinguished Scientist Award
2022: Herbert Tabor Research Award

References

External links
 iBiology seminar series - lectures on protein kinases by Susan Taylor
 NAS InterViews - podcast interview with Taylor

American women biochemists
University of California, San Diego faculty
Members of the United States National Academy of Sciences
Members of the National Academy of Medicine
Fellows of the American Academy of Arts and Sciences
Fellows of the American Association for the Advancement of Science
1942 births
Living people
People from Racine, Wisconsin
Johns Hopkins University alumni
University of Wisconsin–Madison alumni
Howard Hughes Medical Investigators
21st-century American women